The hooded merganser (Lophodytes cucullatus) is a species of fish-eating duck in the subfamily Anatinae. It is the only extant species in the genus Lophodytes. The genus name derives from the Greek language: lophos meaning 'crest', and dutes meaning 'diver'. The bird is striking in appearance; both sexes have crests that they can raise or lower, and the breeding plumage of the male is handsomely patterned and coloured. The hooded merganser has a sawbill but is not classified as a typical merganser.

Hooded mergansers are the second-smallest species of merganser, with only the smew of Europe and Asia being smaller, and it also is the only merganser whose native habitat is restricted to North America.

A species of fossil merganser from the Late Pleistocene of Vero Beach, Florida, was described as Querquedula floridana (a genus now included in Anas), but upon reexamination turned out to be a species closely related to the hooded merganser; it is now named Lophodytes floridanus, but the exact relationship between this bird and the modern species is unknown.

Taxonomy 
The hooded merganser was one of the many bird species originally described by Carl Linnaeus in his landmark 1758 10th edition of Systema Naturae, where it was given the binomial name Mergus cucullatus.

Description

The hooded merganser is a sexually dimorphic species. The adult female has a greyish-brown body, with a narrow white patch over the lower breast and belly. She has a light reddish-brown crest extending from the back of the head.  During the nonbreeding season the male looks similar to the female, except that his eyes are yellow and the female's eyes are brown.

In breeding plumage the dorsal areas and the head, neck and breast of the mature male are mainly black with white markings; there are large white patches on either side of the crest, and they are particularly conspicuous when he raises his crest during courtship. His lower flanks are a rich reddish-brown or chestnut in colour, and the breast and undersides are more or less white, extending into white stripes across the crop and breast.

In both sexes there are narrow white stripes along the tertial wing feathers; when the bird is in repose they have the appearance of longitudinal white stripes along the bird's lower back, if they are visible.

First-winter birds differ from adult females in appearance in that they have a grey-brown neck and upper parts; the upper parts of adult females are much darker — nearly black. Furthermore, the young birds have narrower white edges to their tertial feathers than adults do. Females of all ages are dark-eyed, whereas in males the eyes become pale during their first winter.

Measurements:

 Length: 15.8-19.3 in (40-49 cm)
 Weight: 16.0-31.0 oz (453-879 g)
 Wingspan: 23.6-26.0 in (60-66 cm)

Distribution and habitat
Hooded mergansers are short-distance migrants, and they winter in the United States in regions where winter temperatures allow for ice-free conditions on ponds, lakes and rivers. They have two major year-round ranges. One is in the eastern United States from the southern Canada–US border along the Atlantic Coast to the Gulf Coast in the region of the Mississippi delta. A smaller year-round range extends from Washington state and southern British Columbia to northern Idaho. They also breed to some extent in regions from Missouri to southern Canada and from Nova Scotia to eastern North Dakota and Saskatchewan, migrating when necessary to avoid winter conditions. From 1966 - 2015, the hooded merganser experienced a >1.5% yearly population increase throughout its breeding range.

For preference the hooded merganser lives on small bodies of water such as ponds and small estuaries where there is ample emergent aquatic vegetation, but it also inhabits larger wetlands, impoundments, flooded timber, and rivers. They prefer fresh water but do occur on brackish water bodies as well.

Vagrancy to Europe
Although the hooded merganser is a common species in captivity in Europe and most specimens recorded in the wild are regarded as escapes, a small number of birds have been regarded as genuinely wild vagrants. Britain's current first accepted record is a bird which was seen on North Uist in October 2000. Small numbers are seen regularly in Dublin, but these are presumed to be escapes.

Diet
The hooded merganser is a diving predator that largely hunts by sight while under water. Most studies report that its diet varies according to circumstances, usually being dominated by fish (44-81%). In addition it feeds on aquatic insects (13-20% of its diet) and other aquatic invertebrates such as crabs and crayfish (22-50%).

Reproduction

Males and females of the hooded merganser form monogamous pairs and they remain together until the female has selected a nesting cavity and completed laying her clutch. After that, the male leaves the female to incubate and care for the brood. Females will actively seek out cavities in dead trees or artificial nest boxes such as those provided for nesting wood ducks. They prefer cavities 4–15 feet off the ground. Breeding occurs anytime between the end of February and the end of June, depending on the region.

The female will lay a clutch of 7-15 eggs but only begins incubation when the last egg has been laid, thereby permitting synchronous hatching. All hatchlings are consequently of the same size, which facilitates efficient parental care. During incubation, the female may lose anywhere from 8% to 16% of her body weight.

Like most waterfowl, hooded merganser hatchlings are precocial and usually leave the nest within 24 hours after they hatch; this is about long enough to accommodate synchronous hatching. Once they leave the nest, the young are capable of diving and foraging, but remain with the female for warmth and protection.

Management and conservation
Population declines in the past have been linked with large scale deforestation. Because these waterfowl are cavity nesters, they require mature trees in which suitable nesting sites are likely to be found. It has been suggested that in recent years proper timber management is increasing available habitat successfully. One priority consideration when managing wooded habitat for cavity nesting ducks, is to maintain a sufficient population of mature trees in which suitable nesting cavities would be plentiful. In addition these ducks do make use of artificial nest boxes when available.

Because of their high reliance on aquatic prey, hooded mergansers are very susceptible to harm from many types of pollution, some of which are poisons that accumulate in the food organisms, directly poisoning predators high in the food chain, and some of which simply reduce the populations of their prey.

See also
Pilling's Pond

References

External links

Hooded Merganser Species Account – Cornell Lab of Ornithology
Hooded Merganser - Lophodytes cucullatus - USGS Patuxent Bird Identification InfoCenter
eNature.com: Hooded merganser
Massachusetts Breeding Bird Atlas - Hooded merganser
 
 

hooded merganser
Merginae
Birds of North America
hooded merganser
hooded merganser